Gary Moore (born 29 December 1968) is an English footballer who played in The Football League for Maidstone United.

References

English footballers
Maidstone United F.C. (1897) players
English Football League players
1968 births
Living people
Margate F.C. players
Footballers from the Royal Borough of Greenwich
Association football forwards
Alma Swanley F.C. players